Turan (or Tooran) is a small village in Phillaur tehsil of Jalandhar District of Punjab State, India. The village is administrated by Sarpanch who is elected representative of village.

Caste 
The village has population of 556 and in the village most of the villagers are from schedule caste (SC) which has constitutes 34.35% of total population of the village and it doesn't have any Schedule Tribe (ST) population.

Transport

Rail 

Air 
The other nearest international airport is located in Chandigarh.

References 

Villages in Jalandhar district
Villages in Phillaur tehsil